Gaurotes is a genus of beetles in the family Cerambycidae, containing the following species:

Subgenus Carilia Mulsant, 1863

 Gaurotes adelph a Ganglbauer, 1889 
 Gaurotes atricornis  Pu, 1992 
 Gaurotes atripennis  Matsushita, 1933 
 Gaurotes filiola  Holzschuh, 1998 
 Gaurotes flavimarginata  Pu, 1992 
 Gaurotes glabratula  Holzschuh, 1998 
 Gaurotes glabricollis  Pu, 1992 
 Gaurotes otome  Ohbayashi, 1959 
 Gaurotes pictiventris  Pesarini & Sabbadini, 1997 
 Gaurotes piligera  Pu, 1992 
 Gaurotes tibetana  Podaný, 1962 
 Gaurotes virginea  (Linnaeus, 1758) 

Subgenus Gaurotes LeConte, 1850

 Gaurotes cyanipennis (Say, 1824)
 Gaurotes striatopunctata  Wickham, 1914 †
 Gaurotes thoracica (Haldeman, 1847)

Gaurotes incertae sedis

 Gaurotes aeneovirens  Holzschuh, 1993 
 Gaurotes cuprifera  Holzschuh, 1993 
 Gaurotes fairmairei  Aurivillius, 1912 
 Gaurotes latiuscula  Holzschuh, 1993 
 Gaurotes lucidivirens  Holzschuh, 1998 
 Gaurotes perforata  Holzschuh, 1993 
 Gaurotes spinipennis  Pu, 1992 
 Gaurotes tuberculicollis  (Blanchard, 1871)

References

External links
 Biolib
 Worldwide Cerambycoidea

Lepturinae